KMMM (1290 AM) is a radio station licensed to Pratt, Kansas, United States. The station airs a classic country format, and is currently owned by Rocking M Media, LLC.

As part of owner Rocking M Media's bankruptcy reorganization, in which 12 stations in Kansas would be auctioned off to new owners, it was announced on October 31, 2022 that Pittsburg-based MyTown Media was the winning bidder for KMMM for $41,000. While the bankruptcy court has approved the purchase, the sale was officially filed with the FCC on February 2, 2023.

References

External links
KMMM's website

MMM
Classic country radio stations in the United States